Maharajganj City Council (Maharajganj Nagar Panchayat) is a Nagar Panchayat (City council) located in Siwan district of the Indian state of Bihar.

Geography
The city is divided into total 14 wards. It is the block headquarter of Maharajganj block.

Demographics

 India census, Maharajganj was provisionally reported to have a population of 24,282 of which 12,471 are males while 11,811 are females as per report released by Census India 2011. Population of Children with age of 0-6 is 3642 which is 15.00% of total population of Maharajganj (NP). In Maharajganj Nagar Panchayat, Female Sex Ratio is of 947 against state average of 918. Moreover Child Sex Ratio in Maharajganj is around 972 compared to Bihar state average of 935. Literacy rate of Maharajganj city is 73.55% higher than state average of 61.80%. In Maharajganj, Male literacy is around 81.65% while female literacy rate is 64.96%.

Transport

Maharajganj Railway Station is connected to nearby Siwan Junction, which is connected directly to major cities. Duraundha junction connects with nearby cities like Siwan, Chapra , Patna, Varanasi, Gorakhpur and New Delhi. A new rail route from Maharajganj to Mashrakh has been completed and was inaugurated by the then union minister of state Manoj sinha in October 2018.
Maharajganj is connected by road to the nearby cities like Siwan, Chapra, Varanasi, Patna, Motihari many private and state transport buses provide other options.

History
During British rule, the MG railway line ran through the town. At the time it was a large, regional market. Galla market (Anaj Mandi) and the cloth market were prominent. Mahrajganj was also famous sugarcane cultivation and its market of jaggery.

In connection with the Satyagrah Movement a whirlwind tour of the different parts of Bihar was made by Pt. Jawaharlal Nehru. One of the famous meetings he addressed was at Maharajganj.

Culture 
The "Maunia Baba Mela" is quite popular among the locals and it is also referred by the term "Jhanda Mela". Jarti Mai temple also famous in this area, which is located at Indauli, ward 10.

Economy
Many nationally recognized banks operate there, including Punjab National Bank, Canara Bank, State Bank of India, IDBI Bank, Central Bank, Bank Of Baroda, HDFC Bank, Uttar Bihar gramin Bank, AXIS Bank, Cooperative Bank, Bandhan Bank etc. Retails and Wholesale Market of Maharajganj is quite rich and well established.

Education
 Saraswati Vidya Mandir, Keshav Nagar 
Kendriya Vidyalaya Maharajganj
RBGR College, Mahrajganj
SKJR HIGH SCHOOL 
Gorakh Singh College and School, Maharajganj
USCD DAV Public School, Maharajganj
 St. Joseph School Maharajganj

Electoral constituencies 
 Maharajganj (Bihar Lok Sabha constituency), India
 Maharajganj, Siwan (Vidhan Sabha constituency), Bihar, India

References

Cities and towns in Siwan district